Thiocarbonate describes a family of anions with the general chemical formula  (x = 0, 1, or 2):
for x = 2 it is monothiocarbonate ion 
for x = 1 it is dithiocarbonate ion 
for x = 0 it is trithiocarbonate ion 
Like the carbonate dianion, the thiocarbonate ions are trigonal planar, with carbon atom at the center of triangle, and oxygen and sulfur atoms at the peaks of the triangle. The state of protonation is usually not specified. These anions are good nucleophiles and good ligands.

Thiocarbonates are salts of those ions as well (e.g. sodium dithiocarbonate ).

Thiocarbonates are esters of those ions as well. They contain trigonal planar divalent functional groups similar to these anions.

Monothiocarbonate

Monothiocarbonate is the dianion , which has C2v symmetry. Monothiocarbonate arises by the hydrolysis of thiophosgene or the reaction of base with carbonyl sulfide:

The esters of monothiocarbonic acids are called monothiocarbonates as well (e.g. O-ethyl-S-methyl monothiocarbonate ).

Dithiocarbonates

Dithiocarbonate is the dianion , which has C2v symmetry. It arises from the reaction of aqueous base with carbon disulfide:

Important derivatives of dithiocarbonates are the xanthates (O-esters of dithiocarbonates), with the formula . These salts are typically prepared by the reaction of sodium alkoxides with carbon disulfide.

Another group of dithiocarbonates have the formula . They are often derived by hydrolysis of the corresponding trithiocarbonates (RS)2CS. One example is tetrathiapentalenedione, a heterocycle that consists of two dithiocarbonate groups.

Trithiocarbonates

Trithiocarbonate is the dianion , which has D3h symmetry. Trithiocarbonate is prepared by the reaction of hydrosulfide with carbon disulfide:

The relatively elusive trithiocarbonic acid  has been characterized by X-ray crystallography. Dimethyl trithiocarbonate, is an ester of trithiocarbonic acid.

Perthiocarbonates
Addition of sulfur to trithiocarbonate gives the perthiocarbonate anion , which contains one sulfur–sulfur bond.

Perthiocarbonic acid (or tetrathioperoxycarbonic acid / disulfanylmethanedithioic acid / CAS#13074-70-9) has never been obtained in pure form.

References

Carbonates
Oxyanions
Sulfur ions